This is a list of electricity-generating power stations in Wales, sorted by type and name, with installed capacity (May 2007).

Note that the DBERR maintains a comprehensive list of operational UK power stations here:

Biomass
Biomass power stations:

Nuclear power stations
Nuclear power stations

Coal-fired
Coal-fired power stations:

Gas-fired (or combined gas/coal)
Gas (or combined gas/coal) fired power stations:

Hydro-electric

Hydro-electric power stations:

Oil-fired
Oil-fired power stations:

Wind power
Wind power generating facilities:

See also

 List of power stations in England
 List of power stations in Northern Ireland
 List of power stations in Scotland

References

Citations
 Energy statistics: electricity
 Table of Potential New Conventional Electricity Generating Plants in Great Britain November 2007
 BBC - List of Powerstations in the UK
 px group - operations management, engineering services, energy trading
 Renewable UK - Operational Windfarms

Wales

Wales
Wales
Power stations